Inside Soap is a weekly magazine published in the United Kingdom, released every Tuesday. It covers current and future storylines in soap operas in the United Kingdom, including Coronation Street, Doctors, EastEnders, Emmerdale and Hollyoaks as well as dramas Casualty and Holby City, and Australian soaps Home and Away and Neighbours, which are broadcast in the United Kingdom.

History and profile

In 1996, Inside Soap changed from a monthly issue magazine to being released every two weeks.

Inside Soap traditionally provides interviews from actors who play characters in the soap operas and outlines current storylines.

As of 2022, soaps included in its content are Coronation Street, Doctors, EastEnders, Emmerdale, Hollyoaks  and Australian soap opera Home and Away. Readers are invited to email their questions to soap stars and entries are published in interview format. Soap stars' personal lives are also covered, including tips on fashion and where to purchase clothes worn by the stars.

By 1994, the magazine's circulation had reached around 120,000. In 1995, Inside Soap's publicity claimed that it was the fastest growing consumer magazine in the United Kingdom. In August 1996, it was announced that Inside Soap sales had risen. From January to June 1996, they had gained a fifty-four percent rise in sales according to year on year comparison data. By 1998, it was a market leader in its sales category and by September 2003 it still held its top ranking position.

In September 2002, Hachette Filipacchi began publishing the magazine after the company purchased Attic Futura. In late 2003, Hachette Filipacchi decided to increase their output of Inside Soap and began publishing it weekly. The publisher's decision to publish weekly strengthened sales and by September 2005, the magazine reached 182,618 units in circulation.

Each year, the Inside Soap Awards ceremony is held, where awards are given to the cast and crew of the soaps. In September 2004, the Inside Soap Awards were broadcast on Sky's television channel Living TV

Editors of the magazine have included Vicky Mayer and Jonathan Bowman.

Inside Soap prints stories covering all soap operas broadcast on British television in detail. It includes a feature to inform readers of dates different stories occur titled "what happens when". It also includes terrestrial and digital television listings.

References

External links
 

1992 establishments in the United Kingdom
Magazines about soap operas
Magazines established in 1992
Magazines published in London
Weekly magazines published in the United Kingdom